The 1940 Navy Midshipmen football team represented the United States Naval Academy during the 1940 college football season. In their second season under head coach Swede Larson, the Midshipmen compiled a 6–2–1 record and outscored their opponents by a combined score of 106 to 46.

Schedule

References

Navy
Navy Midshipmen football seasons
Navy Midshipmen football